The 2002 Colorado State Rams football team represented Colorado State University during the 2002 NCAA Division I-A football season. They played their home games at Hughes Stadium in Fort Collins, Colorado and were led by head coach Sonny Lubick.

Schedule

Roster

Team players in the NFL
No Colorado State players were selected in the 2003 NFL Draft.

References

Colorado State
Colorado State Rams football seasons
Mountain West Conference football champion seasons
Colorado State Rams football